Twitchen is a hamlet in Shropshire, England, on the B4385 south of Purslow and near to Hopton Castle.

The southern part of the settlement is called Three Ashes.

A mile southeast of Twitchen is the small railway station at Hopton Heath, on the Heart of Wales Line.

Three civil parishes come together at Twitchen: Clunbury, Hopton Castle and Clungunford.

Hamlets in Shropshire